Aibar (or Aybar) is a town located in the province of Navarre, in the autonomous community of Navarre, northern Spain.

History
García Jiménez of Pamplona was killed at Aybar in 882 in a battle against the Emir of Córdoba (Muhammad ibn Lubb, of the Banu Qasi family). In 1035, the son of Sancho the Great and his mistress Sancha of Aibar, Ramiro inherited his Aragonese lands as well as the town of Aibar. 

In 1062, Aibar became a community within the Kingdom of Navarre. The most famous house in all of Aibar is the Casa Santura housed the Perez-Erdozain family.

References

External links
 AIBAR - OIBAR in the Bernardo Estornés Lasa - Auñamendi Encyclopedia (Euskomedia Fundazioa) 
 

Municipalities in Navarre